Alyssa Rose Giannetti (born October 28, 1994) is an American professional football player. She plays the goalkeeper position.

Youth career 
Alyssa finished her youth career with Legends FC in Southern California.

Collegiate career 
Giannetti played four years (2012-2016) with California Polytechnic State University in San Luis Obispo, California She was named Big West Soccer Defensive Player of the Week three times, on November 4, 2013,  August 31, 2015 and September 21, 2015.

(*) - Indicates school record

Professional career 
Giannetti began her professional career February 2016 with Arna-Bjørnar in the Toppserien, Norway's top women's league. During her rookie 2016 season, she started all 25 official matches during the season, including 22 in the Toppserien League. Giannetti was named the top keeper during the first half of the season.

After the 2016 season, she was named the Toppserien Goalkeeper of the Year by the Norway Football Association. She re-signed with Arna-Bjørnar for the 2017 season but left the club at the end of the season, returning to studies in the USA.

References

External links
 Cal Poly bio

Arna-Bjørnar players
American women's soccer players
Cal Poly Mustangs women's soccer players
Women's association football goalkeepers
Soccer players from California
Living people
1994 births
American expatriate women's soccer players
Expatriate footballers in Norway
American expatriate sportspeople in Norway
Toppserien players